An esploratore (meaning "scout") was a type of Italian warship intermediate between destroyers and light cruisers. Before World War II, existing esploratori were reclassified as destroyers (Italian: cacciatorpediniere).

There was a further group of warships, larger than esploratori, classed as esploratori oceanici, that were effectively unarmoured light cruisers.

Esploratori classes

See also
 Italian World War II destroyers
 Destroyer leader
 Flotilla leader
 Scout cruiser

Ships of the Regia Marina